Fugu is a county of Yulin, in the north of Shaanxi province, China. It is the northernmost county-level division of the province, bordering Inner Mongolia (banners of Jungar, Ejin Horo) to the north, Shanxi to the east and southeast (counties of Baode, Hequ), and, within Shaanxi, the city of Shenmu to the south and southwest.

Administrative divisions
As 2019, Fugu County is divided to 14 towns.
Towns

Climate

See also
Fugu Airport

References

County-level divisions of Shaanxi
Yulin, Shaanxi